"Love & Truth" is the tenth single by the Japanese artist Yui. The title song, "Love & Truth", was used for the Japanese movie Closed Note starring Erika Sawajiri, who played Yui's counterpart role in the TV drama version of Taiyō no Uta. The music video was directed by Takahiro Miki.

Track listing
Normal Edition

Limited Edition
Normal Edition + DVD

Oricon sales chart (Japan)

References

2007 singles
Yui (singer) songs
Oricon Weekly number-one singles
Songs written by Yui (singer)
2007 songs
Japanese film songs